Harry Johansson (c. 1928 – 2010) was a Swedish sprint canoeist who competed in the early 1950s. He won a gold medal in the K-4 10000 m event at the 1950 ICF Canoe Sprint World Championships in Copenhagen.

References

External links

1920s births
2010 deaths
Year of birth uncertain
Swedish male canoeists
ICF Canoe Sprint World Championships medalists in kayak